Governed by Cycling Canada, the Canadian National Road Race Championships is a road bicycle race that takes place as part of the Canadian National Cycling Championships, and decides the best cyclist in this type of race.

The first edition took place in 1959, and was won by Egidio Bolzon. Czeslaw Lukaszewicz holds the record for the most wins in the men's championship with 4. The current champion is Pier-André Côté.

The women's race began in 1974, with France Richer winning the first edition. The women's record is held by Alison Sydor with 4 wins. The current champion is Maggie Coles-Lyster.

Multiple winners

Men

Women

Men

Elite

U23

Women

Elite

U23

Notes

References

External links
Past winners on cyclingarchives.com 

National road cycling championships
Cycle races in Canada
Recurring sporting events established in 1959
1959 establishments in Canada
National championships in Canada